Gilbert Fesselet (16 April 1928 – 27 April 2022) was a Swiss football defender who played for Switzerland in the 1954 FIFA World Cup. He also played for FC La Chaux-de-Fonds and FC Lausanne-Sport.

Fesselet died on 27 April 2022, at the age of 94. He was the last surviving player from the Swiss team in 1954 World Cup.

References

1928 births
2022 deaths
Swiss men's footballers
Switzerland international footballers
Association football defenders
FC La Chaux-de-Fonds players
FC Lausanne-Sport players
1954 FIFA World Cup players
Swiss Super League players
People from La Chaux-de-Fonds
Sportspeople from the canton of Neuchâtel